Nicky Marais, born in 1962 in Rustenburg, South Africa, is a Namibian artist who lives and works in Windhoek. She has worked as a painter, mixed-media artist, activist, and educator.

Biography
After obtaining a fine arts degree from the Port Elizabeth Technikon (now part of the Nelson Mandela University), Marais moved to Windhoek in 1987. There, she began exhibiting her work and joined the editorial board of the feminist magazine Sister Namibia.

In 2006, she founded the collective VA-N (Visual Artists Namibia).

In 2012, she became head of the Visual Arts department at the College of the Arts. In addition to many local exhibitions, she has also exhibited in South Africa, Austria, and Germany.

Work 
Marais is primarily an abstract painter. She first worked on the relationships between shapes and colors, drawing inspiration from the Namibian landscape —particularly the cave paintings of the  Namib Desert — and the socio-political history of Namibia.

More recent work uses stencil and collage techniques, while incorporating found objects into her work, as in her exhibition Presence in Absence at the National Art Gallery of Namibia in 2017, in which she focused on a set of new symbols.

See also
Culture of Namibia
History of Namibia

References

External links
 
 Nicky Marais (works and selected exhibitions)

Namibian painters
Namibian feminists
1962 births
Living people
Namibian women